Millennium Eve: Celebrate 2000 was RTÉ's coverage of the end-of-millennium celebrations from 31 December 1999 into 1 January 2000. Part of the 2000 Today programming in Ireland, a series of well-known broadcasters presented various stages of the nineteen-hour broadcast.

Development
2000 Today was conceived as part of the Millennium celebrations, given the numerical significance of the change from 1999 to 2000.

The programme was produced and televised by an international consortium of 60 broadcasters, including RTÉ and headed by the BBC in the United Kingdom and WGBH in the United States. The BBC provided the production hub for receiving and distributing the 78 international satellite feeds required for this broadcast.

Production
RTÉ launched their millennium eve programming on 30 November 1999.  At the time the programme was described as the largest, single television show in Irish history.  Up to 5,000 staff worked on the 2000 Today project worldwide, with 500 workers based at the RTÉ Television Centre.  In all three television studios were utilised while four outside satellite units, forty cameras in twenty Irish locations worked to pull together an array of images from around both the country and globe.  As part of a Reconciliation 2000 theme RTÉ and BBC Northern Ireland co-operated on several events during the broadcast.

Programming
The first midnight celebrations in the South Pacific and reports from Jerusalem and Nazareth featured.

Ratings
The Millennium Eve: Celebrate 2000 schedule reached 75 per cent of the people of Ireland, the equivalent of 2.6 million viewers. At midnight 74 per cent of the available audience were watching RTÉ One.

References

1999 Irish television series debuts
2000 Irish television series endings
New Year's television specials
RTÉ original programming
Turn of the third millennium